The Fiat S74 was a racing automobile first raced 1903.

In the early 20th century Fiat was heavily involved in racing to promote the reliability and mechanical fortitude of their brand. It was not uncommon for the early four-cylinder engines to displace over ten liters; many reaching into the 20-liter range. For Fiat, they too found provenance in expanding their engines. Their answer in the 1904 Gordon Bennett Cup race, an early type of "Grand Prix" racing, was the S74; a 75-horsepower racer which displaced fourteen liters from its four-cylinder engine.

It was first raced by Vincenzo Lancia (the future founder of the Lancia Company) and Fiat's works driver. He drove in the 1903 Paris-Madrid race, two US Vanderbilt Cup races, Multiple Grand Prix races, and possibly more. The 1912 French Grand Prix was arguably the best showing for the S74 then eight years old. Fiat had their S74 racer in the hands of many including David Bruce-Brown who was in the lead for much of the race. He was disqualified for refueling away from the pits. Ralph De Palma, also driving a S74, was as well disqualified from the race due to repairs performed outside of the pits. First place went to Georges Boillot and his Peugeot followed by Louis Wagner in a Fiat S74.

Existing examples
One of these S74 fiats Is owned by George Wingard in Oregon and on a good year it can be seen racing at Laguna Seca's Monterey Historic Races or the Goodwood Festival of Speed in Great Britain.

References

External links 
 The Fiat S74 at Conceptcarz
 Video of S76 

S74
Fiat S74
Fiat S74
Fiat S74